Doctor or The Doctor is the nickname or stagename for:

 The Doctor (Doctor Who)
 Clive Jackson, aka "The Big Doctor", lead singer of Doctor and the Medics
 W. G. Grace (1848–1915), English cricketer
 Doctor Khumalo (born 1967), South African footballer
 Lindsay McDougall (born 1978), Australian radio host
 Valentino Rossi (born 1979), Italian motorcycle racer
 Roland Rotherham, British historian and lecturer

See also
 Doctor Who
 Doc (nickname)

Doctor, The

Doctor
Doctor
Doctor